The Glencairn Formation is a geologic formation found in Colorado and New Mexico. It preserves fossils characteristic of the Albian Age of the Cretaceous Period.

Description
The Glencairn Formation consists of dark gray shale and buff sandstone and siltstone. The formation is present from central Colorado to the valley of the Dry Cimarron in northeastern New Mexico. The formation locally contains gypsum veins and gypsum-filled desiccation cracks.

This is interpreted as infilling of a drainage system preceding the Kiowa-Skull Creek transgression. It is likely the lateral equivalent of the Tucumcari Shale.

Fossils
The lower beds of the formation are heavily bioturbated and contain abundant fossils of the gryphaeid oyster Texigryphea. The upper beds locally contain petrified plant material. The formation also contains ammonoids, including Goodhallites, Idiohamites, and Engonoceras uddeni, and associated solitary corals, bivalves, and gastropods

History of investigation
The formation was first named as the Glencairn shale member of the now abandoned Purgatoire Formation by G.I. Finlay in 1916, for exposures near Lytle, Colorado. Waage subsequently traced the unit into northeastern New Mexico, where it has been raised to formation rank.

References

Cretaceous Colorado
Cretaceous formations of New Mexico